This is a list of American films released in 2012.

Box office 
The highest-grossing American films released in 2012, by domestic box office gross revenue, are as follows:

January–March

April–June

July–September

October–December

See also
 2012 in American television
 2012 in the United States

References

External links

 
 List of 2012 box office number-one films in the United States

Films
Lists of 2012 films by country or language
2012